"Banditos" is a song by American band The Refreshments from their album Fizzy Fuzzy Big & Buzzy. The song is the band's best-known hit.

A music video was produced to accompany the single, in which the members of the band robbed a bank in Mexico and fled in lead singer Roger Clyne's Toyota Land Cruiser. They eventually give the police the slip through the use of a ridiculous disguise. The video was directed by David Dobkin.

Background

Singer Roger Clyne said he came up with the idea for the song as a broke college student. He imagined making a run to Mexico and getting some money on the way by robbing a store like a Circle K. He wrote the song one morning over coffee with his friends laughing at him, and threw in a reference to Jean-Luc Picard because they were all Star Trek fans. "That was it. Just kind of the compassionate bandito. The guy who really wouldn't hurt a fly. You go to Mexico, you know, that's me," said Clyne. 

Clyne also said the choice of whether to release "Banditos" or "Blue Collar Suicide" as the lead single from Fizzy Fuzzy Big & Buzzy came down to a coin flip upstairs in the studio.

Charts

References

1996 singles
1996 songs
Mercury Records singles
Music videos directed by David Dobkin